Bukharino is a rural locality (a village) in Yesiplevskoye Rural Settlement, Kolchuginsky District, Vladimir Oblast, Russia. The population was 3 as of 2010. There are 2 streets.

Geography 
Bukharino is located on the Ilmovka River, 14 km southeast of Kolchugino (the district's administrative centre) by road. Novoselka is the nearest rural locality.

References 

Rural localities in Kolchuginsky District